The Pukaki River flows through the Mackenzie Basin, Canterbury, in New Zealand's South Island.

However, all water from Lake Pukaki is now diverted into a canal which is fed through three hydroelectric stations before being returned directly into Lake Benmore, as part of the Waitaki Hydroelectric scheme. Occasionally, water may be spilled down the riverbed when Lake Pukaki reaches its maximum height, or if a canal or power station requires servicing.

In 2010, Meridian Energy applied for resource consents to build a 35 MW power station at Pukaki's gate 18. Consent was granted for the project in July 2011. Consent for the project expires in 2021.

References

Rivers of Canterbury, New Zealand
Rivers of New Zealand